A bar bet is a bet made between two patrons at a bar.  Bar bets can range from wagers about little-known trivia, such as obscure historical facts, to feats of skill and strength.  Some bar bets are intended to trick the other party into losing.

Famous bar bets 
 The annual Midnight Sun baseball game played in Fairbanks, Alaska (the only game to be contested after midnight without the use of artificial lighting) was established in 1906 as the result of a bar bet.
 Two of Tony Hawks' books, Round Ireland With A Fridge and Playing The Moldovans At Tennis, were written describing Hawks' attempts to win two bar bets.
 The film To Have and Have Not is supposedly the result of bar bet between Ernest Hemingway and Howard Hawks, with Hemingway betting Hawks that Hawks couldn't make a good film from Hemingway's worst novel.
 A common rumor claims that the creation of Scientology was the result of a bar bet between L. Ron Hubbard and Robert A. Heinlein. Richard Leiby, a reporter for The Washington Post covering the group, never found any evidence to substantiate it.
 A class of Feynman Diagram became known as a Penguin diagram due to a bar bet between physicists John Ellis and Melissa Franklin.

Enforceability

Under contract law, bar bets may or may not be legally binding, and the winning party may have difficulty having a court enforce the bet.
A written contract, drawn up soberly the next day and signed by both parties, can avoid doubt.

For example, if one or both parties are intoxicated when the bet is made, they may be found to lack capacity to agree to a contract, and the contract thus found void or voidable.

However, the fact that the agreement is oral but not written does not undermine it:
oral contracts are valid, though certain contracts must be written, under the statute of frauds, such as for the transfer of land.

Trick bets

In the UK in particular, bar bets are tricks which the "mark" cannot win. They usually depend upon a condition set in the bet that the mark doesn't notice. Some famous examples:

 The mark is told that a coin of a particular denomination has been made so it cannot be laid on its edge. The trickster offers him a sum of money for any the mark can lay on edge. When the mark succeeds, the trickster grabs the coin and rewards him with the promised sum - which is always less than the value of the grabbed coin.
 The trickster bets a mark who has just bought a drink that he can swallow the drink without touching the glass or using a straw. When the bet is taken, the trickster grabs the drink and swallows it - and hands over the wagered sum, again much less than the value of the drink.
 A darts player is bet by the trickster that he will lose a game, even though offered many advantages, one of which is always that the mark's scores will be doubled. Only when close to finishing does the mark realise that because he started from an odd number (say, 201) he cannot finish on a double (as is traditional in darts) because he always has an odd score as a target. The trickster can continue to play from, say, 1001, but is bound to win eventually.
 A mark is informed that it is possible to push a wine glass through the handle of a pint jar without breaking either. When he accepts the bet, the trickster places the wine glass next to the handle and pokes it with a finger that passes through the handle.
 A mark is told that if he stands in the middle of the floor, by the time the trickster has walked around him three times, the mark will have walked away from the encounter. Various conditions ensuring no violence will be used are given, but when the bet is taken the trickster simply sits down, leaving the mark stranded in the middle of the bar.
 Some bar bets are physical impossibilities rather than word-based tricks, such as that supposedly invented by music hall star Tommy Trinder.
Sometimes collectors of bar bets will battle each other to see which one knows the most tricks. It is a given that each must accept the bet proposed by the other.

References

Further reading 
 
 
 
 
 
 
 
 
 Ill Betcha 50 of The Best Bar Bets (August 2015) author TC Tahoe and Erick Olson

Wagering